5130 Ilioneus  is a dark Jupiter trojan from the Trojan camp, approximately  in diameter. It was discovered on 30 September 1989, by American astronomer Carolyn Shoemaker at the Palomar Observatory in California. The assumed C-type asteroid belongs to the 70 largest Jupiter trojans and has a rotation period of 14.8 hours. It was named after Ilioneus from Greek mythology.

Orbit and classification 

Ilioneus is a dark Jovian asteroid orbiting in the trailering Trojan camp at Jupiter's  Lagrangian point, 60° behind on the Gas Giant's orbit in a 1:1 resonance (see Trojans in astronomy). It is also a non-family asteroid of the Jovian background population.

It orbits the Sun at a distance of 5.2–5.3 AU once every 11 years and 11 months (4,343 days; semi-major axis of 5.21 AU). Its orbit has an eccentricity of 0.01 and an inclination of 16° with respect to the ecliptic. The body's observation arc begins with a precovery taken at Palomar in December 1955, almost 34 years prior to its official discovery observation.

Naming 

This minor planet was named by the discover from Greek mythology after Ilioneus, a ship commander and official spokesman under Aeneas. The official naming citation was published by the Minor Planet Center on 4 June 1993.

Physical characteristics 

Ilioneus is an assumed C-type asteroid. Its V–I color index of 0.96 is typical for most D-type asteroids, the dominant spectral type among the Jupiter trojans.

Rotation period 

Photometric observations of Ilioneus were obtained by Stefano Mottola in February 1994. Lightcurve analysis gave a rotation period of  hours with a brightness amplitude of 0.16 magnitude.

Follow-up observations by astronomers at the Palomar Transient Factory in 2013, and by Robert D. Stephens at the Center for Solar System Studies in 2015 and 2017, gave a concurring period determination with an amplitude between 0.18 and 0.34.

Diameter and albedo 

According to the surveys carried out by the Japanese Akari satellite, the Infrared Astronomical Satellite IRAS, and the NEOWISE mission of NASA's Wide-field Infrared Survey Explorer, Ilioneus measures between 52.49 and 60.71 kilometers in diameter and its surface has an albedo between 0.060 and 0.077. The Collaborative Asteroid Lightcurve Link derives an albedo of 0.0602 and a diameter of 59.40 kilometers based on an absolute magnitude of 9.8.

Notes

References

External links 
 Lightcurve Database Query (LCDB), at www.minorplanet.info
 Dictionary of Minor Planet Names, Google books
 Discovery Circumstances: Numbered Minor Planets (5001)-(10000) – Minor Planet Center
 Asteroid 5130 Ilioneus at the Small Bodies Data Ferret
 
 

005130
Discoveries by Carolyn S. Shoemaker
Named minor planets
19890930